Ángel Luis Bossio (5 May 1905 – 31 August 1978) was an Argentine football goalkeeper. He was called "La maravilla elástica" ("The elastic wonder") due to his agility. Bossio was a member of the Argentine team that took part of the 1928 Olympic games and won the silver medal.

He also participated in the first ever World Cup in 1930, where Argentina again finished second behind Uruguay. He played for Argentina 21 times between 1927 and 1935. At club level, Bossio played for Talleres de Remedios de Escalada in the 1920s before joining River Plate after the professionalisation of Argentine football in 1931. In 1959, he managed the first team of Talleres de Remedios de Escalada.

References

External links

Bossio profile

1905 births
1930 FIFA World Cup players
1978 deaths
Sportspeople from Avellaneda
Argentine people of Italian descent
Argentine footballers
Talleres de Remedios de Escalada footballers
Club Atlético River Plate footballers
Footballers at the 1928 Summer Olympics
Olympic footballers of Argentina
Olympic silver medalists for Argentina
Argentina international footballers
Olympic medalists in football
Medalists at the 1928 Summer Olympics
Association football goalkeepers